Lebien is a village and a former municipality in Wittenberg district in Saxony-Anhalt, Germany. Since 1 January 2011, it is part of the town Annaburg. The municipality belonged to the administrative municipality (Verwaltungsgemeinschaft) of Annaburg-Prettin.

Geography
Lebien lies about 8 km south of Jessen.

Economy and transportation
Federal Highway (Bundesstraße) B 187 between Wittenberg and Jessen is about 9 km away.

History
Until 1815, the community belonged to the Amt of Annaburg. In 1550 there were 15 men who owned land, among them twelve Hüfnerner who were directly responsible to the Amt. In the village itself were three free yards, which in 1550 belonged to Hans von Wesenagk, Nicol von Hondorf and Michael am Ende

The village bordered on the Annaburg Heath and the villages of Zwiesigko, Schöneicho, Kähnitzsch, Hohndorf and Plossig.

Lebien was once a branch of Axien and only later got its own church.

References

External links
Administrative community's website

Former municipalities in Saxony-Anhalt
Annaburg